Zoe Cameron (born 1960) is a Jersey physician and former politician. A general practitioner, she served as a Senator of Jersey from October 2014 to July 2016. She was the Bailiwick's only female senator during her term of office. She resigned from the States of Jersey on 12 July 2016, stating that she had "failed to keep my promises to the electorate", and referencing the inaccessibility of the Bailiwick's Council of Ministers and issues with the health department.

Cameron was born on Jersey. She was educated at St Mary's Primary School, Jersey, and at Jersey College for Girls. She then studied medicine at the University of Manchester.

References

Living people
1960 births
Jersey women in politics
Senators of Jersey
Alumni of the University of Manchester
21st-century British women politicians
People educated at the Jersey College for Girls